Thomas Elwyn Griffiths was a Welsh Anglican priest.

Griffiths was born in 1912 and educated at Oriel College, Oxford. He was ordained deacon in 1938, and priest in 1939. After a curacy at Carmarthen he was a minor canon at Brecon Cathedral. Griffiths held incumbencies at New Radnor and Bronllys. He was Archdeacon of Brecon from 1969 until 1978.

References

1912 births
Archdeacons of Brecon
20th-century Welsh Anglican priests
Alumni of Oriel College, Oxford
Year of death missing